Glenys, a Welsh female given name meaning "clean, holy", may refer to:

Glenys Bakker (born 1962), Canadian curler from Calgary, Alberta
Glenys Barton, sculptor working mainly in ceramic and bronze
Glenys Fowles AM (born 1941), Australian operatic soprano
Glenys Kinnock, Baroness Kinnock of Holyhead (born 1944), British politician
Glenys Page (1940–2012), New Zealand cricketer
Glenys Quick (born 1957), retired long-distance runner from New Zealand
Glenys Thornton, Baroness Thornton (born 1952), Labour and Co-operative member of the UK House of Lords

This name is also spelt Glennis and may refer to:
Glennis Grace (born 1978), Dutch singer
Glennis Lorimer (1913–1968), British actress
 Glennis Yeager (1924–1990), wife of Air Force test pilot Chuck Yeager, who named several of his planes Glamorous Glennis for her, including the supersonic Bell X-1

It is also spelt Glennys and may refer to:
Glennys Farrar, American particle physicist and cosmologist
Glennys L. McVeigh, Canadian Federal Court judge
Glennys Young, American historian

See also
Glen
Glenn (disambiguation)
Glennes
Glynis (disambiguation)

Welsh feminine given names